Gilma Jiménez (1956 – June 29, 2013) was a Colombian politician. She was a member of the Senate for Bogota.

Death
Jiménez died of cervical cancer on June 29, 2013 at the age of 57.

References

1956 births
2013 deaths
Colombian politicians
Colombian women in politics
Deaths from cervical cancer
Deaths from cancer in Colombia